Palaeotheriidae is an extinct family of herbivorous perissodactyl mammals related to equids.

Living in dense forests, they ate soft leaves, shoots, berries, and leaf matter picked up from the forest floor.

Morphology
 

Extinction

Evidence suggests that the palaeotheriidae went extinct in Eurasia during the Early Oligocene, approximately 33 Ma, as part of a faunal turnover event known as the Grande Coupure. The Eocene-Oligocene transition marked a significant global cooling event caused by the onset of Antarctic glaciation. This resulted in drier and more open habitats dominating the early Oligocene, and the loss of the dense forests that characterised the Eocene epoch. This environmental change, coupled with the arrival of new and better-adapted mammalian groups from Asia, triggered a decline in endemic European mammals such as the Palaeotheriidae and Anoplotheridae. In the Hampshire Basin of southern England the last record of the paleotheriidae is from the Lower Hamstead Mbr. of the Bouldnor Formation, dating to approximately 33.6 Ma.

Fossil distribution
Creechbarrow Hill Site, Dorset, England
Geiseltal, Mittelkohle, Zone III, Saxony-Anhalt, Germany
Egerkingen, Alpha & Beta fissures, Baselland, Switzerland
La Debruge, Provence-Alpes-Côte d'Azur Region, France
The Caucasus Mountains in Georgia

See also
 Evolution of the horse

References

Prehistoric horses
Eocene first appearances
Oligocene extinctions
Prehistoric mammal families